Karen Adam (born 7 June 1975) is a Scottish politician who has been the Member of the Scottish Parliament (MSP) for Banffshire and Buchan Coast since 2021. A member of the Scottish National Party (SNP), she was previously a councillor for the Mid-Formartine ward of Aberdeenshire from 2017 until her election as an MSP in May 2021.

Early life 
Karen Adam was born on 7 June 1975 in Aberdeen. She was raised in a same-sex household, with her mother and her partner. As a child, she learned British Sign Language as a way to communicate with her deaf father. Adam became a mother as a teenager and she volunteered in her community.

Political career

Early career 
Adam joined the Scottish National Party in 2014, with her parents who have been members of the party since the 1960s. She was elected as councillor for the Mid-Formartine ward in the Aberdeenshire Council in the 2017 Scottish local elections. As a councillor, she worked to update the council's plans for the disabled, such as the sign language plan and autism strategy.

Election to Holyrood 
In November 2020, she was announced as the SNP's candidate for the Banffshire and Buchan Coast constituency for the 2021 Scottish election, succeeding five-term holder Stewart Stevenson. She was elected to serve as the MSP for the constituency, though the SNP's lead dropped from 23% to 2.3% (772 votes). On the day she was sworn in, Adam was the first ever MSP to take the oath of affirmation in British Sign Language.

Death threat 
In November 2020, Adam became subject to a death threat on social media. On Twitter, she posted an upcoming event that was happening in Aberdeenshire, when she received a reply which said "I want to shoot you in the head. You are not serious." Adam originally thought the reply was made by a bot account, until she found out it was a real person.

Police made a visit to her property and they insisted she installed CCTV in her home. Adam's phone number was placed on the police's log list, meaning if she calls them, she will received an answer urgently. The account was reported to the police and has been suspended by Twitter.

Backbencher 
Adam is a member of the Scottish Parliament's Equalities, Human Rights and Civil Justice Committee and the Rural Affairs, Islands and Natural Environment Committee.

In January 2022, Adam responded to Ghislaine Maxwell's conviction for sexual abuse by tweeting: "Paedophiles and predators are people. Not bogey men under the bed. Not Mac wearing flashers in the street, faceless and nameless. They are our family, friends and colleagues. They are not scary monsters. They are people who abuse. It's uncomfortable to humanise them because we then have to face the horrors in plain sight." Alba Party general secretary Chris McEleny interpreted this as an attempt to humanise child abusers, which Adam firmly rejected. She was sent death threats and Police Scotland later launched an investigation. She later told The Guardian: "It started to dawn on me that this was not accidental, that people were perhaps purposely misrepresenting my words. [They were] purposely misrepresenting my words for political gain and to support political movements. I've seen this before. The more open I am about my progressive views, the more I am called a pervert, or a predator enabler, for supporting trans rights, for supporting LGBT rights overall."

Adam condemned what she called a "malcious, creepy attempt" to silence her in December 2022 during a GRA reform debate.

Personal life 
Adam lives in Aberdeenshire with her five sons. She is grandmother to her oldest and only daughter's children. She is a carer to her deaf father and has six children, some with special needs. She had her first child as a teenager and married the child's father, but later divorced him due to spousal abuse. After the divorce, she became a Mormon for 20 years, but left the church after divorcing her second husband and father of the rest of her children, who was having an affair.

References

External links 

 

Living people
Scottish National Party MSPs
Members of the Scottish Parliament 2021–2026
Female members of the Scottish Parliament
Politicians from Aberdeen
Scottish National Party councillors
Councillors in Aberdeenshire
Women councillors in Scotland
1975 births